Cosmopolitan on the Park, or simply the Cosmopolitan, is a high-rise condominium building in Portland, Oregon's Pearl District, in the United States. Construction began in 2014 and was completed in 2016. It is the tallest building in the Pearl District and the tallest residential tower in Portland. Its glass curtain exterior wall system was designed by Benson Industries, of Portland, which designed and manufactured a similar exterior for One World Trade Center, in New York City.

See also

 List of tallest buildings in Portland, Oregon

References

External links
 
 

2016 establishments in Oregon
Apartment buildings in Portland, Oregon
Pearl District, Portland, Oregon
Residential buildings completed in 2016
Residential skyscrapers in Portland, Oregon